Parry McCluer High School (PMHS) is a high school located in Buena Vista, Virginia, United States.  The school has an enrollment of approximately 336 students. Its current principal is Dr. Todd Jones, and its current assistant principal is Troy Clark. The school band is the Marching Blues.

Athletics
The Parry McCluer High School football team has won the state championship five times: in 1977, 1979, 1983, 1986, and 1987. The team was state runner-up in 1991.

The golf team won the 1980 state championship.

The boys' cross country team won the 1980 single A state championship, and took runner-up in the 2011–12 state championship, losing to George Mason High School. Riley Erekson, Dalton Scott, Logan Arthur, and Dallas Keiser won the 4x800 meter relay race at the Virginia Class 1A State Track Meet with a time of 8:23, breaking the previous state record for that event. They also took second place in the 4x400 meter race in the same meet.

The PM Softball team won Back to Back State Championships in 2015 and 2016. Their head coach is Troy Clark. The PM softball team had 3 participants in VHSCA All Star game in 2016 (Logan Buzzard – shortstop, Lexy Johnson – catcher, and Troy Clark – Coach). PM softball also had 3 participants in the 2017 VHSCA All Star game (Kelsi Martin – pitcher, Carrington Balser– third base, and Troy Clark – Coach).

The girls' basketball team won their first state title in 2017 under Coach Adam Gilbert, and went on to repeat as champions the following season (2018), while winning the regional tournament as well.

The Marching Blues
The Parry McCluer marching band was formed by the local chapter of the American legion in 1941. It did not become an official school unit nor take on the name "marching" until 1947. The band was very successful, especially in the 1960-1990 period, during which it won first place in marching for at least one Festival of States competition, as well as many other notable achievements

The Marching Band was directed by Shannon Light from 2016 to 2020, and by Adam Miller from 2020 to 2022. The current band director is Josh Holsinger.

Notable alumni
 Charlie Manuel – manager of the Philadelphia Phillies, 2005–2013
Tony Deyo – standup comedian

Popular culture
Parry McCluer High School features prominently in Orson Scott Card's novel, The Lost Gate and its sequels.

References

Public high schools in Virginia
Education in Buena Vista, Virginia